Ribosomal protein S6 kinase alpha-5 is an enzyme that in humans is encoded by the RPS6KA5 gene. This kinase, together with RPS6KA4, are thought to mediate the phosphorylation of histone H3, linked to the expression of immediate early genes.

Interactions
RPS6KA5 has been shown to interact with CREB1.

References

Further reading

EC 2.7.11